Željko Loparić (born 3 December 1939) is a Yugoslav-born Brazilian philosopher, historian of philosophy and university teacher. Born in modern-day Croatia, he is a naturalized Brazilian, and professor at the University of Campinas.

Bibliography 
Heidegger, Rio de Janeiro (2004)
Sobre a responsabilidade, Porto Alegre (2003)
A semântica transcendental de Kant, Campinas (2000)
Descartes Heurístico, Campinas (1997)
Ética e finitude, São Paulo (2004)
Optuženik Heidegger, Zagreb (1991)
Heidegger réu. Um ensaio sobre a periculosidade da filosofia, Campinas (1990)

References

External links 
 Zeljko Loparic – Official Page

1939 births
Living people
Yugoslav emigrants to Brazil
Croatian philosophers
Brazilian people of Croatian descent
Brazilian philosophers
Naturalized citizens of Brazil
Heidegger scholars